Mary Jane Theis (born February 27, 1949) is an Illinois Supreme Court Justice for the First Judicial District in Cook County, Illinois.

Early life
She was born Mary Jane Wendt in Chicago, Illinois, to Eleanore and Kenneth Wendt, a member of the Illinois General Assembly and a longtime judge in Cook County. She is a member of the Democratic Party.

She received her bachelor's degree from Loyola University Chicago and her J.D. degree from the University of San Francisco School of Law.

Career

Attorney
Theis was assistant public defender in Cook County from 1974 to 1983.

Political career
Theis became a judge in 1983, serving as associate judge (1983–1988), circuit court judge (1988–1994), and appellate court judge (1993–2010). In 2010, she was appointed by the Illinois Supreme Court to fill a vacancy on its bench, taking office October 26, 2010. She won a full term in a partisan election in 2012. In the general election, Chicago Tribune endorsed her for election to a full term, citing her "universally accepted expertise on judicial ethics, family law, sentencing, fairness." She previously served as chair for the Illinois Judicial Conference's Committees on Education and Judicial Conduct, as well as on the Illinois Supreme Court's rules committee. In September 2022, she was named chief justice after the retirement of then-chief justice Anne M. Burke, effective October 26, 2022.

Educator
Theis has taught at law schools in Chicago (Loyola University School of Law, Northwestern University School of Law, and the John Marshall Law School) and at Illinois and Chicago bar association conferences and seminars.

Honors and awards
Awards which Theis has received include a Lifetime Achievement Award from the Illinois Judges Association, the Mary Heftel Hooten Award from the Women's Bar Association of Illinois, and the Access to Justice Award from the Illinois State Bar Association.

Personal life
Theis is married to John T. Theis, and they have two children and seven grandchildren.

References

External links

 
 

|-

1949 births
21st-century American judges
21st-century American women judges
Chief Justices of the Illinois Supreme Court
Illinois Democrats
Illinois state court judges
Justices of the Illinois Supreme Court
Lawyers from Chicago
Living people
Loyola University Chicago alumni
Public defenders
University of San Francisco School of Law alumni
Women chief justices of state supreme courts in the United States